Okannatie Creek is a stream in the U.S. state of Mississippi.

Okannatie is a name derived from the Choctaw language purported to mean "commencement of day". A variant name is "Oconitahatchie Creek".

References

Rivers of Mississippi
Rivers of Union County, Mississippi
Mississippi placenames of Native American origin